Madjid Fahem is a French guitarist born in Paris in 1973. He is member of Manu Chao band from 2000.

He was born in the suburbs of Paris, of Algerian parents. At age 16, he took an old acoustic guitar from his father and started playing with his uncles. From there he did not separate from that instrument again. His musical role models include Django Reinhardt and Paco de Lucía, while Dire Straits and Eric Clapton influenced him in the early stages of his musical development.

Fahem initially played with various local bands and then joined the formation "La Kinky Beat", until he joined in 2000 as a guitarist founded by Manu Chao band Radio Bemba.

He joined several local groups before joining the group Radio Bemba in 2000, which accompanies singer-songwriter Manu Chao.

He is known for his "fire solos", including the live version of "Clandestino". Play a Gibson SG for electric tracks, or a classical guitar for songs that sound rumba or traditional.

Finally, Madjid was involved in the development of Manu Chao's latest album, La Radiolina of 2007. In addition to Chao, Fahem has collaborated in more than fifteen recordings of different artists.

Manu Chao appreciates the collaboration with Fahem very much, in an interview he describes Fahem exuberantly as "a monster, one of the best guitarists in the world".

Discography 
2002: Radio Bemba Sound System
2004: Sibérie m'était contéee
2004: Made in Barna
2007: La Radiolina
2008: Asthmatic Lion Sound Systema
2008: I Come From 
2009: Baionarena
2009: L'hiver Est Là
2009: Tudo é possible
2013: Santalegria
2016: Black Is Beltza ASM Sessions - Irun Lion Zion In Dub (Vol II)

References

External links 

1973 births
French guitarists
Military personnel from Paris
French rock musicians
World music musicians
Living people
French people of Algerian descent
21st-century guitarists